Naposletku... (trans. In The End...) is the ninth studio album released by Serbian and former Yugoslav singer-songwriter Đorđe Balašević. Featuring only acoustic instruments, Naposletku... is Balašević's first completely folk rock-oriented album. Similar sound would be featured on Balašević's 2004 album Rani mraz.

Track listing
All the songs were written by Đorđe Balašević.
"Naposletku" (In The End) – 5:46
"Dođoška" (The Immigrant) – 4:16
"Namćor" (Grumpy Man) – 5:34
"Regruteska" (The Recruitesque) – 7:18
"Poslednja nevesta" (The Last Bride) – 4:10
"Miholjsko leto" (Indian Summer) – 4:47
"Sin jedinac" (The Only Son) – 4:47
"Drvena pesma" (Wooden Song) – 5:59
"Uspavanka za dečaka" (Lullaby for a Boy) – 4:19

Personnel
Đorđe Balašević – vocals
Aleksandar Dujin – piano
Dušan Bezuha – guitar
Đorđe Petrović – keyboard, string arrangements, producer
Aleksandar Kravić – bass guitar
Josip Kovač – saxophone
Petar Radmilović – drums
Gudači Svetog Đorđa – strings
Ignac Šen – Violin (on "Naposletku" and "Poslednja nevesta" )
Josip Kiki Kovač – soprano sax (on "Namćor" and "Uspavanka za dečaka")
Goran Marinković – bassoon (on "Drvena pesma")
Nenad Marinković – oboe (on "Drvena pesma")
Dragan Kozarčić – trumpet (on "Regruteska")
Aleksandra Stojanović – sound engineer

References
 EX YU ROCK enciklopedija 1960–2006, Janjatović Petar;  

1996 albums
Đorđe Balašević albums